Gilberto Ariel Velásquez Gómez (born 11 March 1983) is a Paraguayan footballer who plays for Tacuary as centre back.

Velásquez began his career at Guaraní and was promoted to the first team in January 2002, aged 19, in where he played more than 50 games and scored three goals. In January 2007, he signed for the Chilean Primera División club Colo-Colo along with his countrymen Edison Giménez, team that had a very successful season, being runner-up of the Copa Sudamericana. However, he only played four games in the Apertura Tournament, but was champion of that tournament.

In June 2007, he leave the Chilean club for return to his country for play at Olimpia, another successful team in where he has played. Two seasons later, he joined to Nacional and shortly after he signed for 3 de Febrero.

He represented to the Paraguay national under-20 football team in the 2003 FIFA World Youth Championship held in United Arab Emirates, playing only three games in that tournament. The next year, he played two friendly games with his national team against South Korea and Mexico.

Honours

Club
Colo-Colo
 Primera División de Chile (1): 2007 Apertura

External links
 BDFA profile
 Statistics at fifa.com

1983 births
Living people
Paraguayan footballers
Paraguay under-20 international footballers
Paraguayan expatriate footballers
Club Guaraní players
Club Olimpia footballers
Club Nacional footballers
Club Atlético 3 de Febrero players
Club Rubio Ñu footballers
Club Tacuary footballers
Colo-Colo footballers
Paraguayan Primera División players
Chilean Primera División players
Expatriate footballers in Chile
Expatriate footballers in Colombia
Association football defenders
Sportspeople from Asunción